The 568th Air Defense Group is a disbanded United States Air Force organization. Its last assignment was with Air Defense Command (ADC)'s 4709th Air Defense Wing at McGuire Air Force Base, New Jersey, where it was inactivated in 1954. The group was originally activated as a support unit for a combat group at the end of World War II on Guam, but was soon inactivated.

The group was activated once again in 1952 to replace the support elements of the inactivating 52d Fighter-Interceptor Wing.  A year later ADC established it as an operational headquarters for fighter-interceptor squadrons as well.  It was replaced in 1954 when ADC transferred McGuire to Military Air Transport Service and its operational squadrons were transferred to other ADC units.

History

World War II
The group was activated toward the end of World War II as the 568th Air Service Group as part of a reorganization of Army Air Forces (AAF) support groups in which the AAF replaced Service Groups that included personnel from other branches of the Army and supported two combat groups with Air Service Groups including only Air Corps units.  It was designed to support a single combat group. Its 1031st Air Engineering Squadron provided maintenance that was beyond the capability of the combat group, its 1032nd Air Materiel Squadron handled all supply matters, and its Headquarters & Base Services Squadron provided other support. The unit provided support for one combat group in the Pacific Theater.  It was disbanded in 1948.

Cold War

During the Cold War the group was reconstituted, redesignated as the 568th Air Base Group, and activated at McGuire AFB in 1952 in a major reorganization of ADC responding to ADC's difficulty under the existing wing base organizational structure in deploying fighter squadrons to best advantage. It replaced the 52nd Air Base Group as host unit for McGuire. The group was assigned seven squadrons to perform its support responsibilities. It also maintained aircraft stationed at McGuire.

The group was redesignated as the 568th Air Defense Group in 1953 and assumed responsibility for air defense of Northeast United States.  It was assigned the 2d and 5th Fighter-Interceptor Squadrons (FIS), flying early radar equipped and 20mm cannon armed Lockheed F-94 Starfire aircraft from the 4709th Defense Wing as its operational elements. The 2nd and 5th FIS were already stationed at McGuire. The same month that it transferred to the 568th, the 2nd FIS briefly traded its F-94s for Republic F-84 Thunderjet Aircraft. Both the 2nd and 5th FIS converted to radar equipped and Mighty Mouse rocket armed North American F-86 Sabres in July 1953.

In 1954, McGuire AFB transferred from ADC to Military Air Transport Service, and the group was inactivated. The group's support components were replaced by elements of the 1611th Air Transport Wing Its operational flying squadrons were assigned back to the 4709th Air Defense Wing. The group was disbanded once again in 1984.

Lineage
 Constituted as 568th Air Service Group
 Activated ca. 5 June 1945
 Inactivated ca. 31 May 1946
 Disbanded on 8 October 1948
 Reconstituted and redesignated as 568th Air Base Group on 1 January 1952
 Activated on 1 February 1952
 Redesignated as 568th Air Defense Group on 16 February 1953
 Inactivated on 8 July 1954
 Disbanded on 27 September 1984

Assignments
 Twentieth Air Force, 1945–1946
 4709th Air Defense Wing, 1 February 1952 – 8 July 1954

Components

Operational Squadrons
 2d Fighter-Interceptor Squadron, 16 February 1953 – 8 July 1954
 5th Fighter-Interceptor Squadron, 16 February 1953 – 8 July 1954

Support Squadrons

 568th Air Police Squadron, 1 February 1952 – 8 July 1954
 568th Food Service Squadron, 1 February 1952 – 8 July 1954
 568th Field Maintenance Squadron, 1 February 1952 – 8 July 1954
 568th Installations Squadron, 1 February 1952 – 8 July 1954
 568th Medical Squadron (later 568th USAF Dispensary, 568th USAF Hospital), 1 February 1952 – 8 July 1954

 568th Motor Vehicle Squadron, 1 February 1952 – 8 July 1954
 568th Operations Squadron, 1 February 1952 – 8 July 1954
 568th Supply Squadron, 1 February 1952 – 8 July 1954
 1031st Air Engineering Squadron, ca. 5 June 1945 – ca. 31 May 1946
 1032nd Air Materiel Squadron, ca. 5 June 1945 – ca. 31 May 1946

Stations
 Guam, Mariana Islands, 1945 – 1946
 McGuire Air Force Base, New Jersey, 1 February 1952 – 8 July 1954

Aircraft
 Republic F-84G Thunderjet, 1953
 North American F-86D Sabre, 1953–1954
 Lockheed F-94A Starfighter, 1953

See also
 Aerospace Defense Command Fighter Squadrons
 List of F-86 Sabre units
 F-94 Starfire units of the United States Air Force

References

Notes

Bibliography

 Buss, Lydus H.(ed), Sturm, Thomas A., Volan, Denys, and McMullen, Richard F., History of Continental Air Defense Command and Air Defense Command July to December 1955, Directorate of Historical Services, Air Defense Command, Ent AFB, CO, (1956)
 
 
  Grant, C.L., (1961)  The Development of Continental Air Defense to 1 September 1954, USAF Historical Study No. 126

Further reading

External links
 Abstract, History of 568th Air Service Group, Feb-May 1946 (accessed 17 June 2012)

0568
Aerospace Defense Command units
Military units and formations established in 1952
Military units and formations disestablished in 1984